The Hundred of Fisher is a cadastral hundred of South Australia, founded in 1860.
It is located at 34°36′16″S 139°36′6″E in the County of Eyre, South Australia. The main town of the hundred is Punyelroo, in the Mid Murray Council.

The Hundred is on the banks of the Murray River.

References

Fisher